Henry Currie (1798 – 1873) was the Conservative MP for Guildford from 1847 to 1852.

Early life
He was the son of William Currie, of East Horsley Park, Surrey, MP for Gatton, and his wife, Percy, daughter of Francis Gore. He was the cousin of Sir Frederick Currie, 1st Baronet (1799–1875). He was educated at Eton College.

Career
Currie lived at West Horsley Place, in West Horsley, Surrey.

Personal life
In 1825, Currie married Emma Knox, the daughter of Colonel Thomas Knox, and they had three children:
Henry William  Currie (1828-?)
Emily Currie, married Charles Henry Wyndham A'Court in 1854
Mary Currie, in 1859, married Sir Edward Robert Sullivan, 5th Baronet of Ravenhead, Lancs.

References

1798 births
People educated at Eton College
1873 deaths
Conservative Party (UK) MPs for English constituencies
Members of the Parliament of the United Kingdom for Guildford
UK MPs 1847–1852